Jonathan Yeo (born 18 December 1970, in London, England) is a British artist who rose to international prominence in his early 20s as a contemporary portraitist, having painted Kevin Spacey, Dennis Hopper, Cara Delevingne, Damien Hirst, Prince Philip, Erin O'Connor, Tony Blair, and David Cameron among others. GQ has called him 'one of the world's most in-demand portraitists'. He was educated at Westminster School.

His unauthorised 2007 portrait of George W. Bush, created from cuttings of pornographic magazines brought him worldwide notoriety, shown in London, New York and Los Angeles.

Yeo's 2016 mid-career survey at the Museum of National History at Frederiksborg Castle followed a retrospective at the National Portrait Gallery, London, in 2013 and the Lowry in Manchester in 2014.

Yeo was the subject of a BBC Culture Show Special in September 2013. The monograph The Many Faces of Jonathan Yeo, featuring works from throughout his career, was published by London-based publisher Art / Books in the same month.

His paintings are included within the permanent collections of the National Portrait Gallery, London, the Laing Art Gallery, Newcastle, The Museum of National History at Frederiksborg Castle in Denmark, and The Royal Collection.

Career
Yeo taught himself to paint in his twenties while recovering from Hodgkin's Disease. In the early 2000s, he became known for his contemporary realist portraits of well-known figures. His subjects include actors Dennis Hopper, Jude Law, Kristin Scott Thomas, Lily Cole, Nicole Kidman, Turner Prize-winning artist Grayson Perry, Savile Row tailor Ozwald Boateng, the former Danish Prime Minister Helle Thorning-Schmidt, Camilla, Duchess of Cornwall and media tycoon Rupert Murdoch. In 2005, his portrait of Erin O'Connor was used to advertise London's National Portrait Gallery around the world. The painting was used as the front cover of '500 Portraits', a survey of the BP Portrait prize published in 2011.

Yeo was commissioned by the House of Commons as the official Election Artist for the 2001 general election, and he painted the leaders of the three largest parties. His triptych of Tony Blair, William Hague, and Charles Kennedy, entitled, 'Proportional Representation', was made up of canvases sized according to the subjects' popularity.

In January 2008, Yeo's official portrait of former Prime Minister Tony Blair was unveiled and struck a public chord with its clear Iraq war reference. It showed an older and wearier-looking Blair wearing a red poppy - a symbol of war remembrance for the British. In line with the political subjects that have featured throughout his work, in 2009, Yeo painted a full-length portrait of David Cameron just before his election to Prime Minister, which was sold at auction in 2010 for £200,000.

Between 2010 and 2012, Yeo created works based on cosmetic surgery procedures. He presents the faces of women in pre and post-operative states, as a counterpoint to the traditional portrait. This collection of paintings was the subject of two solo exhibitions, 'You're Only Young Twice' at Lazarides in London and ‘(I’ve Got You) Under My Skin' at Circle Culture Gallery in Berlin .

'Jonathan Yeo Portraits' at the National Portrait Gallery, London (2013-2014) included a selection of new and older works by Yeo. The new portraits included individuals who have made a significant mark on their field of expertise, including: the arts, theatre, and politics. Sitters include Doreen Lawrence, Kevin Spacey, Damien Hirst, Malala Yousafzai, and Grayson Perry.

In 2014, the exhibition was shown at The Lowry Gallery in Salford and in 2015, it was on display at the Museum of National History at Frederiksborg Castle in Denmark in honour of Yeo having painted the first official portrait of the former Danish Prime Minister, Helle Thorning-Schmidt.

Yeo is art consultant at Soho House group. He has co-curated the clubs worldwide, and designed the now notorious, pornographic leaf wallpaper that adorns several of its walls, including the Dean Street Townhouse in London and Soho House, Berlin. Jonathan Yeo was a judge for the 2010 Art Fund Prize for museums. In 2014 Yeo was on the panel of judges for the BP Portrait Prize.

In April 2011, the Queen commissioned Yeo to paint a portrait of David Attenborough for the Royal Collection.

In February 2016, Yeo's portrait of the actor Kevin Spacey in the role of President Francis J. Underwood, from the Netflix series House of Cards, was unveiled at the Smithsonian National Portrait Gallery in Washington, DC. Spacey unveiled the painting in character as the fictional President Underwood, joking "I'm pleased the Smithsonian continues to prove itself as a worthwhile institution.  I'm one step closer to convincing the rest of the country that I am the president." Netflix made a short film of the collaboration between the museum, actor, and artist to promote the fourth season of House of Cards, which premiered that same evening.
 
In March 2016, Yeo's largest retrospective to date opened at the Museum of National History at Frederiksborg Castle in Denmark. A new series of paintings of the actor and model Cara Delevingne was unveiled at the museum as part of the exhibition.  This series of portraits was made over an eighteen-month period and is concerned with image making and performed identity. Yeo said: "the way we manipulate and read self-portrait images, or 'selfies', in the last five years has far more in common with the activity of the 16th-century portrait artists and audiences than any art movement since the birth of photography". A portrait of the former Danish Prime Minister, Helle Thorning-Schmidt, was also unveiled at the opening of this exhibition and will remain at the museum as part of its permanent collection. A new monograph, titled 'In The Flesh', was published by the museum to accompany the show.

Controversy
In 2003 Yeo presented a diptych full-frontal nude of the then ICA chairman, Ivan Massow, the entrepreneur and patron of the arts at the Royal Society of Portrait Painters.

Yeo created a controversial portrait of George W Bush in 2007, entitled 'Bush', which gained worldwide attention. After a commission to paint the US president was reportedly awarded and then withdrawn, Yeo created an image of the President anyway, making a collaged portrait from pornography. The work led to Yeo exhibiting more collages – mainly portraits and nudes – made in the same way.

At the first of these exhibitions in 2008, Yeo presented 'Blue Period' at Lazarides Gallery, owned by Steve Lazarides, a specialist dealer in outsider and street art, known for launching Banksy' career. The show included the Bush porn portrait as well as new collages of Hugh Hefner and Lucian Freud.

It was reported that the George Bush collage was seized by Israeli customs on the way to the Banksy-curated 'Santa's Ghetto' exhibition in Bethlehem in December 2007.

'Porn in the USA', Yeo's first US solo show, was staged by Lazarides, taking place in Beverly Hills, Los Angeles, and was met by critical acclaim. Following on from the success of 'Bush' (2007), this exhibition included portraits of Tiger Woods and Sarah Palin created from pornographic collage cutouts.

Yeo had two works involved in the dispute over the sale of the late Dennis Hopper's art collection. He was one of only three artists to have been commissioned by Hopper to paint his portrait, the other two being Andy Warhol and Julian Schnabel. Hopper described his work as 'timeless and exquisite' Jonanthan Yeo's sitting targets.

Critical reception
In his Guardian review of the Blair portrait, Jonathan Jones accuses Yeo and his subject of conspiring to manipulate the image of the former PM, claiming that, 'Blair is a tacit co-conspirator who walked in wearing the poppy, then sat as bleak as he looks here, in invitation to the artist to home in on that tell-tale paper flower.

Some commentators have suggested that, by making portraits and other work which poke fun at the politicians and celebrities they depict, he risks alienating the very people whom he used to paint very successfully. NPG director Sandy Nairne was reported as being concerned about Yeo pushing the porn collage theme too far saying 'the Bush collage was a riposte. And there was a certain logic in that riposte. What is more puzzling is what happens after that.'

Charles Saumarez-Smith, former Director of the National Gallery and Royal Academy, said of the porn-collage of Lucian Freud, 'Yeo is the young rising star of portraiture and Freud is the acknowledged master. It's a homage that has its tradition in the past. Painters would quite often do portraits of other artists they admired. Admittedly this one of Freud is rather different as Yeo has used this other dimension – people's private parts.'

At the launch of Yeo's National Portrait Gallery show, The Guardian described him as 'one of the UK's most highly regarded portrait artists'Jonathan Yeo's Malala Yousafzai portrait goes on show for first time, and GQ named him 'one of the world's most in-demand portraitists. Malala Yousafzai revealed she was touched that Yeo asked to paint her and 'honoured' that her picture would hang in the National Portrait Gallery.

Personal life
Yeo is the son of British politician Tim Yeo. He is married to the former actress and journalist Shebah Ronay. They live in London and have two daughters.

Notable exhibitions
Solo shows:
The Museum of Danish National History at Frederiksborg Castle 2016 – 20 March – 30 June 2016
Exposure, Circle Culture Gallery, Hamburg .10 July 2015 – 28 October 2015
The Laing Art Gallery, Newcastle upon Tyne 8 November 2014 – 15 February 2015
The Lowry Gallery, 14 March 2014 – 29 June 2014
National Portrait Gallery, 11 September 2013 – 5 January 2014
(I’ve Got You) Under My Skin, Circle Culture Gallery, Berlin, 9 November 2012 - 28 February 2013
You're Only Young Twice, Lazarides, London, 9 December 2011 - 21 January 2012
Porn in the USA, Lazarides LA, Beverly Hills, 9 July - 8 August 2010
Blue Period, Lazarides, London, 5 June – 11 July 2008
Jonathan Yeo's Sketchbook, Eleven, London, 17 February – 17 March 2006

References

External links
Artist Website
Jonathan Yeo on Artnet
High Definition view Jonathan Yeo Paintings
www.woostercollective.com: JONATHAN YEO UNVEILS ‘BUSH’. 28 August 2007. Retrieved 2008-01-12.
Kriston Capps. Portrait of the President as a Skin Mag. The American Prospect. 11 September 2007. Retrieved 2008-01-12.
National Portrait Gallery - Jonathan Yeo Portraits
Jonathan Yeo interview with GQ
 

1970 births
Living people
People educated at Westminster School, London
Contemporary painters
Alumni of the University of Kent